The Volvo Experimental Taxi was a concept car built by Volvo sometime in 1976. It was designed to be the response by Volvo after being challenged by the New York Office of Transport and the Museum of Modern Art. The Taxi was powered by a six cylinder diesel engine which drove the front wheels.

It was also designed to be able to fit a wheelchair inside; however, it could not fit the wheelchair’s occupant. Instead of seat belts the passenger seating was provided with a roller coaster style pull down bar.

See also 
 Alfa Romeo New York Taxi

References

City Taxi